Bradyrhizobium liaoningense is a species of legume-root nodulating, microsymbiotic nitrogen-fixing bacterium. It was first isolated from Glycine soja and Glycine max root nodules in China. Its type strain is strain 2281.

References

Further reading

External links

LPSN
Type strain of Bradyrhizobium liaoningense at BacDive -  the Bacterial Diversity Metadatabase

Nitrobacteraceae
Bacteria described in 1995